Karl Matthew Broadhurst (born 18 March 1980) is an English retired footballer who played as a central defender.

Biography
Broadhurst was born in Portsmouth and joined AFC Bournemouth at the age of 12. He progressed through the youth system and made his first team debut in the League Cup against Charlton Athletic in the 1999-00 season where he won man of the match. His league debut came four days later, and he quickly established himself in the first team squad. Despite being hampered by a persistent ankle injury which kept him out until October 2000, he made 32 appearances during the 2000-01 season. He was an ever-present the following season until February 2002 when he lost his place in the team, thanks to a broken nose sustained in training and the fine form of Shaun Maher. He regained his place in the team for the first half of 2002–03, and scored his first goal for the club in November 2002. However, he then suffered first a broken ankle, and then a dislocated shoulder, which ended his season.

The 2003–04 season saw Broadhurst make 44 appearances as captain of the first team, and the first half of the following season was also trouble-free. In February 2005 he was sidelined with a recurring back problem which meant he missed an entire year of first team football, not playing for the first team again until February 2006. After making 30 appearances during the 2006–07 season, his contract was not renewed and he left Bournemouth on 8 May 2007, after a fourteen-year association with the club.

On 4 July 2007 he signed for Hereford United. He was also made captain for the 2007–08 season.

After a good start to the 2007–08 season at the heart of the Hereford defence, Broadhurst suffered an ankle injury in the FA Cup against Leeds United. He returned for the run-in as Hereford gained promotion to Football League One. Despite missing the opening matches of the following season with a dislocated shoulder, he re-established himself as first choice centre back. At the end of the season he was released by Hereford after two seasons at the club. After a trial at his former club Bournemouth he joined Crawley Town at the start of the 2009–10 season.

Broadhurst featured regularly at the heart of the Crawley defence throughout the season, whilst he failed to get on the scoresheet, he was sent-off on two occasions. At the culmination of the season, it was reported that he would not be offered a further contract at Crawley and was free to leave.

In the 2010 close season Karl signed for Conference North side AFC Telford United however left without making any senior appearances due to work commitments. In July 2011, he made a shock return to football signing up with Solihull Moors. In July 2013 he finally retired but has continued in his role as assistant manager. Broadhurst left by mutual consent just before the end of the 2013–14 season.

Career statistics

References

External links
Official Hereford United Profile

1980 births
Living people
Footballers from Portsmouth
Association football defenders
English footballers
AFC Bournemouth players
Hereford United F.C. players
Crawley Town F.C. players
AFC Telford United players
Solihull Moors F.C. players
English Football League players